The Eneti or Enetoi were an Illyrian people dwelling inland of Illyria, in an area located to the north or north-west of Macedonia in classical antiquity. They were neighbors of the Dardani and the Triballi.

The Eneti, along with the Taulanti, are the oldest attested peoples expressly considered Illyrian in early Greek historiography. The Eneti are mentioned by Herodotus (5th century BC) in the Classical era and Appian (2nd century AD) in the Roman era. Also Stephanus of Byzantium (6th century AD) most likely mentioned them in his Ethnica, as suggested by  Eustathius of Thessalonica (12th century AD) in his Commentaries on Homer's Iliad.

Name
The Illyrian Eneti are mentioned by early Greek ethnographic historian Herodotus (Hist. I, 196, 5th century BC) in the Classical era as Ἰλλυριῶν Ενετούς, Illyrion Enetous. Appian (Mith. 8.55, 2nd century AD) mentioned them in his accounts of the early 1st century BC Mithridatic Wars of the Roman Republic. Also the toponymic dictionary Ethnica (Εθνικά) of Stephanus of Byzantium (6th century AD) provided information about them, which was consulted by Eustathius of Thessalonica (12th century AD) and reported in his Commentaries on Homer's Iliad.

History
The Eneti, along with the Taulanti, are the oldest attested peoples expressly considered Illyrian in early Greek historiography.

Herodotus' account (Hist. I, 196) of the 5th century BC is one of the earliest concerning the Illyrian peoples. Explaining the Babylonian custom of the annual sale of young girls ready to get married, the ancient historian remarks that the same custom was practiced by the Illyrian Eneti.

Appian (Mith. 8.55) reports that in the Mithridatic Wars (88 – 63 BC) between the Roman Republic and the Kingdom of Pontus under Mithridates VI, during an interval that arose when Roman consul Lucius Cornelius Sulla Felix was awaiting Mithridates' reply to the offered peace terms, Sulla marched against the Eneti, the Dardani, and the Sinti, three tribes neighboring Macedonia who were continually invading this Roman province, and he devastated their territory. Eustathius of Thessalonica (ad Hom. Il. 2.852, I) reports that the Ethnica of Stephanus of Byzantium recorded the Eneti as a tribe beside the Triballi.

References

Citations

Bibliography 

Illyrian tribes
Ancient tribes in Albania
Ancient tribes in Kosovo
Ancient tribes in North Macedonia
Illyrian Albania
Illyrian Kosovo